Elektra is a 2005 superhero film directed by Rob Bowman. It is a spin-off from the 2003 film Daredevil, starring the Marvel Comics character Elektra Natchios (portrayed by Jennifer Garner). The story follows Elektra, an assassin who must protect a man and his prodigy daughter from another assassin who was hired by The Hand.

For the screenplay, Zak Penn, Stuart Zicherman, and Raven Metzner received "written by" credit. Mark Steven Johnson received credit for "motion picture characters" and Frank Miller for "comic book characters". Filming started around May 2004 in Vancouver.

The film was released on January 14, 2005. Upon its release, Elektra was a commercial and critical failure, grossing $56 million against a production budget of $43–65 million. It received negative reviews from critics, who found the script and storyline lacking, but many praised Garner's performance.

Plot
After being killed in Daredevil, Elektra Natchios is revived by blind martial arts master Stick. He teaches her the ancient art of Kimagure, which provides its practitioners with precognition as well as the ability to resurrect the dead. Elektra is expelled from the training compound because of her inability to let go of her rage and fear of seeing her mother's killer as a child. She leaves and uses her training to become a contract killer.

Years later, McCabe, Elektra's agent, receives an unusually large offer from an anonymous client wishing to hire Elektra. The only stipulation: she must spend a few days in a rented home on the island where the assassination is to be performed before the names of the targets are revealed. During the wait, Elektra catches a girl named Abby trying to steal her mother's necklace. She sends her away, and later meets and befriends her father, Mark Miller. Abby invites Elektra to dinner on Mark's behalf. Elektra develops a romantic interest in Mark but soon learns that he and Abby are the targets she has been hired to kill. Elektra spares them and leaves, but returns in time to protect them from assassins sent by The Hand, a crime syndicate of ninja mercenaries.

Roshi, master of The Hand, learns of the failed attempt and permits his son Kirigi to lead a new team of assassins to kill Elektra and return with Abby, referred to as "The Treasure". Elektra tries to leave Abby and Mark with Stick, but he scolds her and tells her to protect them herself. She takes Mark and Abby to McCabe's country house, but is followed by Kirigi, Typhoid, Stone, Kinkou, and Tattoo. Elektra flees with Mark and Abby through a secret underground exit to an orchard, while McCabe sacrifices himself to buy them time.

Kirigi and the assassins hunt down the trio in the orchard. Elektra kills Stone, while Abby and Mark kill Kinkou with one of his own daggers. As Elektra is distracted by the revelation that Abby has martial arts skills, Typhoid gives Elektra the "Kiss of Death". Abby is captured by Kirigi. Stick and his Chaste ninjas arrive, forcing Kirigi, Typhoid, and Tattoo to retreat. Stick saves Elektra from death and takes them under his protection.

Stick confirms that Abby is the "Treasure", a martial arts prodigy, whom the Hand seeks to use. Elektra learns that she was a Treasure herself, resulting in her mother becoming a casualty of the fight between The Chaste and The Hand. She also guesses that Stick set up the hit on Mark and Abby in order to test Elektra's propensity for compassion.

Elektra astrally projects herself to a meeting with Kirigi and challenges him to a fight, the winner claiming Abby for their own purpose. Elektra returns to her childhood home to face Kirigi and realizes that the horned demon who killed her mother was actually Kirigi.

Elektra is defeated by Kirigi. Abby arrives and engages him long enough for Elektra to recuperate. Elektra and Abby then escape and hide in a hedge maze, but Abby is captured by snakes dispatched by Tattoo. Elektra finds Tattoo and snaps his neck, releasing Abby. Elektra engages Kirigi a second time and kills him. Typhoid poisons and kills Abby, before Elektra throws her sai at Typhoid, killing her. Elektra desperately tries to wake Abby, then calms herself, lets go all of her rage, and successfully resurrects her using Kimagure.

Elektra gets ready to leave. She and Mark share one final kiss. Elektra tells Abby to live a normal life and that they each gave each other's life back. Elektra leaves, hoping that Abby won't grow up to be like her. Stick appears and points out that Elektra didn't turn out so bad. Elektra bows to Stick to thank him. He bows to Elektra, then disappears.

Cast

Ben Affleck reprised his role as Matt Murdock/Daredevil from Daredevil in a deleted cameo appearance, where he appeared to Natchios in a dream sequence.

Production
In 1987, after the success of Frank Miller's "Elektra: Assassin," Marvel tried to adapt the graphic novel into a live-action movie. After selling the rights of Elektra to New Line Cinema, Frank Miller was hired to pen a screenplay based on the graphic novel of the same name. Later on, screenwriters Jim McBride and L.M. Kit Carson were hired to write a second script. Director Oliver Stone later signed on to direct and wanted volleyball player, model, and actress Gabrielle Reece to star as Elektra. The project was later cancelled after the rights to Elektra was sold to 20th Century Fox.

Garner reportedly did not want to do the film and only did it because she was legally required due to contractual obligations from Daredevil. The film was made during Jennifer Garner's hiatus from the television show Alias, and production was limited by that timeframe. Ben Affleck reprised his role as Matt Murdock / Daredevil in a cameo appearance, but it was cut from the final film. The scene was included on the DVD as a deleted scene.

Director Rob Bowman knew going into the project that the production time was going to be short and they would be limited in what they could achieve, but thought that critics would appreciate what he was able to do with the relatively small $43 million budget. Bowman saw it not as an all action spectacle but as "a story about a character learning about compassion". He said shooting and preparation made for very long days, and as little as four hours sleep a night, and that he used "every trick in the book I had to pull that movie off in that short amount of time."

Bowman stated that the film was "literally 12 frames of film from an R-rating" due to MPAA objections to several death scenes.

Music

Elektra: The Album was released in 2005 by Wind-up Records. As with many Wind-up soundtracks, almost none of the songs featured on the album were actually used in the film. "Sooner or Later" is played briefly in one scene and a remix not included on this album of "Hollow" is also played. The end credits features "Wonder", "Photograph", and "Thousand Mile Wish (Elektra Mix)": but other than this, none of the songs on the album were used in the actual motion picture. A score album was released by Varèse Sarabande containing selections of Christophe Beck's original music from the film.

Release

Home media
The DVD of Elektra was released on April 5, 2005. It featured several deleted scenes, including one featuring Ben Affleck reprising his role from Elektras predecessor, Daredevil (2003). It was released on VHS in May 2005.

Director's cut
An extended and slightly refined two-disc unrated director's cut DVD was released in October 2005, featuring a cut detailed for home video release. Unlike the Daredevil director's cut which added about thirty minutes of material not in the original theatrical release, this version only changed about seven minutes of footage, extending the total runtime by just three minutes. It was also criticized for poor video transfer.

A Blu-ray of Elektra was released on October 19, 2009, for the United Kingdom (and France) only. The US version was released on May 4, 2010. It contains only the unrated director's cut of the film.

Reception

Box office
Elektra opened on January 14, 2005, in the United States in 3,204 theatres. In its opening weekend, it ranked fifth, taking $12,804,793. In its second weekend, it took $3,964,598, a drop of 69%. Domestically the total gross was $24,409,722, at the time the lowest for a film featuring a Marvel Comics character since Howard the Duck. The film had a worldwide total of $56,681,566.

Critical response
The film received largely negative reviews from film critics. The site's critical consensus reads: "Jennifer Garner inhabits her role with earnest gusto, but Elektra tone-deaf script is too self-serious and bereft of intelligent dialogue to provide engaging thrills." On Metacritic, the film has a score of 34 out of 100 based on 35 critics, indicating "generally unfavorable reviews". Audiences surveyed by CinemaScore gave the film a grade "B" on scale of A to F.

Roger Ebert of the Chicago Sun-Times gave the film 1.5 out of 4, and wrote: "Plays like a collision between leftover bits and pieces of Marvel superhero stories. It can't decide what tone to strike." 
Helen O'Hara at Empire magazine gave the film 2 out of 5 stars, and says "Despite oozing star quality, Garner struggles to rise above the limitations of the script." Brian Lowry of Variety writes: "Elektra" proves no more than fitfully satisfying, a character-driven superhero yarn whose flurry of last-minute rewriting shows in a disjointed plot." 
Claudia Puig of USA Today writes "Her (Garner's) grace and mystical abilities make for a lonely burden, and we are supposed to feel her pain. Instead, we feel our own for having to sit through this silly movie." Puig concluded that Garner "is far more appealing when she's playing charming and adorable, as she did so winningly in 13 Going on 30.
Jonathan Rosenbaum of the Chicago Reader writes: "This doesn't exactly set the world on fire, but I was charmed by its old-fashioned storytelling, which is refreshingly free of archness, self-consciousness, or "Kill Bill"-style wisecracks."

Director Rob Bowman was somewhat surprised by the negative reviews, he accepted the difficulty of making something with mass market appeal "Everybody likes ice cream, but not everybody likes chocolate ice cream" but acknowledged the film's shortcomings and said "if you can't handle people not liking what you do, you shouldn't be in the business".

Accolades
Jennifer Garner and Natassia Malthe were nominated for Best Kiss at the 2005 MTV Movie Awards.

Garner was nominated in the category Choice Movie Actress: Action Adventure/Thriller at the 2005 Teen Choice Awards.

Legacy
Film critic Scott Mendelson blamed the film for ruining Jennifer Garner's career, and said it killed off the notion of a female lead superhero movie for a decade.
In March 2005, producer Avi Arad told investors that Marvel had made a mistake rushing Elektra into release. "We will never do that again," he said. 
In an email released because of the Sony Pictures hack, Marvel Entertainment CEO Ike Perlmutter cited Elektra as an example of an unprofitable female led superhero film. He wrote: "Very bad idea and the end result was very, very bad."

In 2016, Katharine Trendacosta at io9 reviewed the film and called it "Somehow So Much Worse Than You Remember" and said that the version of Elektra in Netflix's Daredevil could only be an improvement.

Video game
Elektra was also supposed to have a video game based on the movie with support from the comics. The game was never released, as publishers felt it would not be popular enough. A game based on the film was released for mobile.

References

External links

 
 
 
 
 Elektra at Marvel.com

Superheroine films
2005 films
2005 action films
2005 martial arts films
2000s superhero films
20th Century Fox films
American fantasy action films
Canadian fantasy films
English-language Canadian films
Daredevil (film series)
2000s English-language films
Films scored by Christophe Beck
Film spin-offs
Films about secret societies
Films based on works by Frank Miller
Films directed by Rob Bowman
Films produced by Avi Arad
Films shot in Vancouver
Martial arts fantasy films
Ninja films
Films about obsessive–compulsive disorder
Films with screenplays by Zak Penn
American superhero films
Regency Enterprises films
Resurrection in film
Superhero drama films
Japan in non-Japanese culture
Films produced by Arnon Milchan
2000s American films
2000s Canadian films
Live-action films based on Marvel Comics